Lord Muskerry may refer men with the title:

Viscount Muskerry
Baron Muskerry